Jean-Chrysostome Raharison (born 23 August 1979), commonly referred to as Bota, is a Malagasy international footballer who plays for AS Excelsior, as a goalkeeper.

Career
Born in Antananarivo, Madagascar, Farro has played club football in Madagascar and Réunion for DSA Antananarivo, USCA Foot, FC Ilakaka, AS Marsouins and SS Saint-Louisienne.

References

1979 births
Living people
Malagasy footballers
People from Antananarivo
Malagasy expatriate footballers
Expatriate footballers in Réunion
Madagascar international footballers
Association football goalkeepers
USCA Foot players
DSA Antananarivo players